Christian Ludger Ohiri (19 June 1938 – 7 November 1966) was a Nigerian athlete. He competed in the men's triple jump at the 1964 Summer Olympics. He died of leukaemia in 1966. He graduated from Harvard College.

References

External links
 

1938 births
1966 deaths
Athletes (track and field) at the 1964 Summer Olympics
Nigerian male triple jumpers
Olympic athletes of Nigeria
Deaths from leukemia
Harvard College alumni
20th-century Nigerian people